Astyleiopus is a genus of beetles in the family Cerambycidae. It is monotypic, being represented by the single species, Astyleiopus variegatus.

References

Acanthocinini